Modus was a popular Slovak band, originally established in 1967 by  Stanislav Hrda, Ján Baláž,             

Peter Krutek, Juraj Czinege, Tomáš Bery Psota, Ľubomír Stankovský, Gabriel Wertlen and Miroslav Žbirka in the former Czechoslovakia. The formation (identified nowadays as Modus 0) initially played cover versions of the 60's hits. A major change followed after the arrival of Ján Lehotský who joined the ensemble in 1972, and became their leader. The years 1976-80, which included albums Modus (1979) and Balíček snov (1980), referred to as Modusmania, denoted the band's stardom era.

Past members

Stanislav Hrda - piano, keyboards (1967–68)
Ján Baláž - solo guitar (1967–72, 74-75)
Miro Žbirka - lead vocal, guitar (1967–72, 76-81)
Gabriel Wertlen - bass (1967–70)
Ľubo Stankovský - drum (67-72,74), lead vocal (83-86)
Peter Krutek - vocals, trumpet (1967–70)
Juraj Czinege - vocals, saxophone, clarinet (1967)
Tomáš "Bery" Psota - vocals, trombone (1967)
Tomáš Berka - vocals, keyboards (1968)
Eugen Kratochvíla - piano, keyboards (1969–70)
Mikuláš Gürtler - vocals, others (1970)
Vladimír Kaššay - bass (1970–72, 83-86)
Ján Lehotský - lead vocal, piano, keyboards (1972–89)
Ľudovít Nosko - lead vocal, bass (1974)
Ladislav Severa - solo guitar (1975)
Ladislav Lučenič - bass (1975, 77)
Cyril Zeleňák - drum (1975)
Karel Witz - solo guitar (1976) (as guest in 80)
Štefan Havaši - bass (1976)
Miroslav Jevčák - drum (1976–78)
Marika Gombitová - lead vocal, others (1976–83)

Viliam Pobjecký - solo guitar (1977–79)
Dušan Hájek - drum (1979–80)
Ján Hangóni - lead vocal, solo guitar (1981–83)
Anastasis Engonidis - bass (1981–83)
Karol Morvay - lead vocal, drum (1981–83)
Jiří Vana - solo guitar (1983–86)
Marián Greksa - lead vocal, others (1984–85)
Milan Vyskočáni - lead vocal, others (1985)
Ivona Novotná - lead vocal, others (1985–88)
Miroslav Šulc - solo guitar (1987–89)
Miroslav Valenta - solo guitar, keyboards (1987–89)
Peter Palkovič - bass (1987–89)
Ivan Marček - drum (1987)
Jozef Paulíni - lead vocal (1987–88)
Peter Szapu - drum (1988)
Peter Beláni - drum (1988–89) 
Iveta Sedláková - lead vocal, others (1988–89)
Marcela Březinová - lead vocal, vocals (1989)
Lešek Semelka - lead vocal, others (1989)

Guest performances
Imrich Diskantíni - tenor saxophone (1985)
Ján Fabrický - drum (1988)

Discography

Albums

Studio albums

Export albums

Compilations

Singles

As lead artist

As featured artist

Notes
A  Denotes a solo single by Miro Žbirka.
B  Denotes a solo single by Marika Gombitová.
C  Denotes a solo single by Pavol Hammel, no contribution.
D  Denotes a solo single by Žbirka featuring Gombitová.
E  Denotes a single by Lehotský and Gombitová

See also
 Marika Gombitová discography
 Marika Gombitová awards
 Car accident of Marika Gombitová
 The 100 Greatest Slovak Albums of All Time

References

General

Specific

External links
Janko Lehotský official website
 

1967 establishments in Czechoslovakia
1989 disestablishments in Czechoslovakia
Slovak rock music groups
Musical groups established in 1967
Musical groups disestablished in 1989